Qarbah is a sub-district located in Az Zahir District, Al Bayda Governorate, Yemen.  Qarbah had a population of 2582 according to the 2004 census.

References 

Sub-districts in Az Zahir District